The 1972 1. divisjon was the 28th completed season of top division football in Norway.

Overview
It was contested by 12 teams, and Viking FK won the championship, their second league title.

Teams and locations
''Note: Table lists in alphabetical order.

League table

Results

Season statistics

Top scorers
 Egil Solberg, Mjøndalen – 16 goals
 Johannes Vold, Viking – 16 goals

Attendances

References
Norway - List of final tables (RSSSF)
Norsk internasjonal fotballstatistikk (NIFS)

Eliteserien seasons
Norway
Norway
1